Civil Aviation Administration Denmark (CAA-DK). (SLV) was the Danish government agency that oversaw all civil aviation in Denmark, including the autonomous areas of Greenland and the Faroe Islands.

CAA-DK, with its head office in Copenhagen, was part of the Danish Ministry of Transport. In addition to the regulation of civil aviation, it also operated the Bornholm Airport.

On 1 November 2010 the Danish Transport Authority and the Civil Aviation Administration - Denmark were merged to one administration. The name of the new administration is the Danish Transport Authority. The former CAA-DK attends to the same tasks as before and remains at the same address.

References

External links

 Civil Aviation Administration Denmark (Archive)
 Civil Aviation Administration Denmark (Archive) 

Government of Denmark
Denmark
Civil aviation in Denmark
Transport organizations based in Denmark